Jonas Jensen-Abbew (born 20 April 2002), also known as AJ, is a Danish professional footballer who plays as a centre-back for FC Nordsjælland.

Club career

Early years
Jensen-Abbew started his career at B1973 in Herlev, before joining AB as a U15 player. In September 2018, 16-year old Jensen-Abbew also went on a trial at English Premier League club Tottenham's U18 team.

Nordsjælland
As a U17 player, in January 2019, Jensen-Abbew joined FC Nordsjælland. In his first six months in Nordsjælland, he won the Danish U17 league with his team. His first year as a U19 player, the 2019-20 season, was plagued by injuries for Jensen-Abbew, but it turned into six U18 national matches that season, and he also played a number of matches for the club's first team, against a number of Danish 1st Division clubs in the winter training matches. In the 2020–21 season, Jensen-Abbew captained the U19 team.

On 4 April 2021, 18-year old Jensen-Abbew made his official debut for Nordsjælland in the Danish Superliga against AGF. Jensen-Abbew started on the bench, before replacing Adamo Nagalo in the 66th minute. This was his only professional appearance in the 2020–21 season.

Jensen-Abbew was permanently promoted to the first team squad ahead of the 2021–22 season. At the end of July 2022, Jensen-Abbew was loaned out to Danish 1st Division club HB Køge for the rest of the year.

Personal life
Jensen-Abbew has a Danish mother and a Ghanaian father.

References

External links
 
 Jonas Jensen-Abbew at DBU

2002 births
Living people
Danish men's footballers
Danish people of Ghanaian descent
Association football defenders
Denmark youth international footballers
Danish Superliga players
Danish 1st Division players
Akademisk Boldklub players
FC Nordsjælland players
HB Køge players